Cornelia Sochor (born 7 June 1994) is an Austrian footballer who plays as a defender. She has been a member of the Austria women's national team.

References

1994 births
Living people
Women's association football defenders
Austrian women's footballers
Austria women's international footballers
SV Neulengbach (women) players
ÖFB-Frauenliga players